Daniel John Harding  (born 31 August 1975) is a British conductor.

Biography
Harding was born in Oxford. He studied trumpet at Chetham's School of Music and was a member of the National Youth Orchestra at age 13. At age 17, Harding assembled a group of musicians to perform Pierrot Lunaire of Arnold Schoenberg, and sent a tape of the performance to Simon Rattle in Birmingham.  After listening to this tape, Rattle hired Harding as his assistant at the City of Birmingham Symphony Orchestra for a year, from 1993 to 1994.  Harding then attended the University of Cambridge, but after his first year at university, Claudio Abbado named him his assistant with the Berlin Philharmonic Orchestra. Harding first conducted the Berlin Philharmonic at age 21.  At the time of his first conducting appearance at The Proms in 1996, he was then the youngest-ever conductor to appear there. Harding has stated that he has never had formal conducting lessons. He is a former Seiji Ozawa Fellow in conducting at Tanglewood Music Center.

In 1997, Harding was the Music Director of the Ojai Music Festival alongside pianist Emanuel Ax. Harding has been music director of the Trondheim Symphony Orchestra (1997–2000), the Deutsche Kammerphilharmonie Bremen (1999–2003) and the Mahler Chamber Orchestra (2003–2008).  Harding now has the title of conductor laureate with the Mahler Chamber Orchestra.  He conducted the 2005 opening night at La Scala, Milan in Idomeneo, as a substitute after the resignation of Riccardo Muti earlier in 2005.

In 2004, Harding was appointed principal guest conductor of the London Symphony Orchestra (LSO), as of 2006.  One of his new projects with the LSO involved the Sound Adventures program for new compositions. With the LSO, he has conducted a commercial recording of the opera Billy Budd for EMI Classics. He became the Principal Conductor of the Swedish Radio Symphony Orchestra in 2007.  In September 2009, he extended his contract as the orchestra's principal conductor through 2012. In April 2013, the orchestra further announced the extension of Harding's contract to 2015. With the orchestra, he has recorded commercially for the Sony Classical label.  In June 2015, the Orchestre de Paris announced the appointment of Harding as its 9th principal conductor, effective September 2016. Harding concluded his tenure in the Orchestre de Paris post following the close of the 2018-2019 season.  In October 2018, the Swedish Radio Symphony Orchestra announced the extension of Harding's contract as principal conductor through 2023, along with granting him the new title of konstnärlig ledare (artistic leader).  In November 2021, the orchestra announced an additional extension of Harding's contract through 2025.

Outside of Europe, in September 2010, Harding took the title of music partner of the New Japan Philharmonic.  In April 2012, Harding became artistic director of the Ohga Hall in Karuizawa, Japan.

In 2021, Harding conducted the annual Vienna Philharmonic Summer Night Concert for the first time, the first British conductor to lead this concert.

Personal life
Harding has two children, Adele and George, from his past marriage to Béatrice Muthelet, a violist and co-principal violist of the Mahler Chamber Orchestra.  The marriage ended in divorce. Harding is a particular fan of the football club Manchester United.  Harding is a licensed airline pilot, and in 2019 had announced his intention in 2020 to take a sabbatical from conducting to be a commercial pilot with Air France, plans delayed in the wake of the COVID-19 pandemic.  Harding was appointed Commander of the Order of the British Empire (CBE) in the 2021 New Year Honours for services to music.

References

External links
 Askonas Holt, artist management

1975 births
Deutsche Grammophon artists
Living people
English conductors (music)
British male conductors (music)
EMI Classics and Virgin Classics artists
20th-century British conductors (music)
People from Oxford
People educated at Chetham's School of Music
Sony Classical Records artists
21st-century British conductors (music)
20th-century British male musicians
21st-century British male musicians
Erato Records artists
Commanders of the Order of the British Empire
Musicians from Oxfordshire
Commercial aviators